TAF9 RNA polymerase II, TATA box binding protein (TBP)-associated factor, 32kDa, also known as TAF9, is a protein that in humans is encoded by the TAF9 gene.

Function 
Initiation of transcription by RNA polymerase II requires the activities of more than 70 polypeptides. The protein complex that coordinates these activities is transcription factor IID (TFIID), which binds to the core promoter to position the polymerase properly, serves as the scaffold for assembly of the remainder of the transcription complex, and acts as a channel for regulatory signals. TFIID is composed of the TATA-binding protein (TBP) and a group of evolutionarily conserved proteins known as TBP-associated factors or TAFs. TAFs may participate in basal transcription, serve as coactivators, function in promoter recognition or modify general transcription factors (GTFs) to facilitate complex assembly and transcription initiation. This gene encodes one of the smaller subunits of TFIID that binds to the basal transcription factor GTF2B as well as to several transcriptional activators such as p53 and VP16. A similar but distinct gene (TAF9B) has been found on the X chromosome and a pseudogene has been identified on chromosome 19. Alternative splicing results in multiple transcript variants encoding different isoforms.

Structure 
The 17-amino-acid-long trans-activating domains (TAD) of several transcription factors were reported to bind directly to TAF9: p53, VP16, HSF1, NF-IL6, NFAT1, NF-κB, and ALL1/MLL1. Inside of these 17 amino acids, a unique Nine-amino-acid transactivation domain (9aaTAD) was identified for each reported transcription factor. 9aaTAD is a novel domain common to a large superfamily of eukaryotic transcription factors represented by Gal4, Oaf1, Leu3, Rtg3, Pho4, Gln4, Gcn4 in yeast and by p53, NFAT, NF-κB and VP16 in mammals. TAF9 is supposed to be a universal transactivation cofactor for 9aaTAD transcription factors.

Interactions 

TAF9 has been shown to interact with:
 GCN5L2, 
 Myc, 
 SF3B3, 
 SUPT7L, 
 TADA3L, 
 TAF5, 
 TAF6L, 
 TAF10,
 TAF12, 
 TAF5L, 
 TATA binding protein, 
 Transcription initiation protein SPT3 homolog,  and
 Transformation/transcription domain-associated protein.

References

Further reading